Khoi may refer to:

Clothing 

 Khoyi, traditional cap of Gilgit-Baltistan, Pakistan

People 
The Khoekhoe people
The Khoekhoe language

Places 
Khoy, a city in Iran
Khoy County, an administrative subdivision of Iran

Radio 
KHOI (FM), a radio station (89.1 FM) licensed to serve Story City, Iowa, United States

Animals 
Koi, a type of ornamental domesticated fish commonly kept for decorative purposes in outdoor ponds